Deh-e Abbas (also Romanized as Deh-e ‘Abbās and Deh ‘Abbās) is a village in Jorjafak Rural District, in the Central District of Zarand County, Kerman Province, Iran. At the 2006 census, its population was 105, in 22 families.

References 

Populated places in Zarand County